Cara Heads (born October 7, 1977, in Costa Mesa, California) is an Olympic weightlifter for the United States.  Her coaches are Tony Ciarelli and Stephanie Ciarelli, Howard Cohen, Bob Morris and Dr. Kyle Pierce.

Early life
Sports have always been a part of Heads' life. Throughout high school, she was a scholar athlete and played 3 different sports. She played basketball. competed in track and field, and weightlifting. She was selected onto the All Orange County track and field team. In basketball, her team was Co-Champion of the Sea View League, two time CIF finalists, and state regional finalists. As a weightlifter, Heads qualified for the Junior World Weightlifting Championships in Warsaw, Poland.

Education
Heads obtained her degree from the University of California Berkeley where she also participated in track and field. She competed in the hammer throw and in her freshman year earned 3rd place in the Pacific Athletic Conference Track and Field championships.

After her first year in school, Heads transitioned her focus from track and field to weightlifting. She decided to drop out of school and pursue her career in weightlifting and train amongst the best female weightlifters. After the Olympic Games she went back to California Berkeley to finish her degree.

Career
Heads, at one point, was one of the top seven weightlifters in the world in her weight class.

Weightlifting achievements
 Olympic team member (2000)
 Bronze Medalist in Junior World Championships (1997)
 Silver Medalist in Pan Am Championships (1999)
 Titan Games Champion (2004)
 Senior World Championships team member (1998, 1999, 2002, & 2004)
 Pan Am Games team member (2003)
 Gold Medalist in NACACI Championships (1997)
 Silver Medalist in 1997 Silver Dragon Championships
 Gold Medalist in Copa Guatemala Championships (1995 & 1997)
 Senior National Champion (1997, 1998, 2000, 2002–2005)
 Junior National Champion (1996 & 1997)
 American Open Champion (2002–2004)
 Best Lifter at Junior National Championships (1996)

References

External links
 Cara Heads - Official Website
 Cara Heads - Hall of Fame at Weightlifting Exchange

1977 births
Living people
Olympic weightlifters of the United States
Weightlifters at the 2000 Summer Olympics
Weightlifters at the 1999 Pan American Games
Weightlifters at the 2003 Pan American Games
American female weightlifters
Pan American Games silver medalists for the United States
Pan American Games medalists in weightlifting
Medalists at the 1999 Pan American Games
21st-century American women
20th-century American women